On Your Feet is The Movement's first studio album, recorded at Pat Casey's Modern Music Studios in Columbia, South Carolina and released in March 2004. The recording, mixing and tracking were all completed in three separate eight-hour sessions in the studio. All of the beats for the album were made on a drum machine "in about a day".

On Your Feet is generally considered to be a mainstay of the rock/reggae genre and is listed at number nine on The Pier's 10 Essential Rock Reggae Albums.

Track listing
All tracks by Jordan Miller, Jon Ruff, and Josh Swain.

"Intro" – 1:14
"Hola" – 4:06
"On Your Feet... A Dog's Industry" – 3:56
"Scary" – 5:37
"Down Down" – 4:20
"To the Moon and Back" – 5:59
"No Wood" – 2:26
"Cold Outside" – 3:51
"Wolves" – 3:42
"Fault" – 4:45
"Livest Shit" – 5:10
"The Ballad of Two J's" – 5:59
"The Connection" (feat. Lyrikal Buddah) – 6:08
"Purpose" – 6:18.

Personnel
Lyrikal Buddah - vocals
Jordan Miller - guitar, vocals
Jon Ruff - turntables
Josh Swain - bass, guitar, vocals

External links
 The Movement's Official Website
 The Pier's interview with Josh Swain and Jordan Miller

References

2004 debut albums
The Movement (reggae band) albums